Exploring China: A Culinary Adventure was a four-part British documentary television series that aired on BBC Two.

Chefs Ken Hom and Ching He Huang, both Chinese food specialists, described their travels through China and the recipes and personal stories they found there. Hom and Huang traveled to Beijing, learning about Peking duck, and on to the Silk Road, Kashgar, and Sichuan Province, together bringing a unique and authoritative perspective on Chinese food. Ken and Ching undertook a 3000-mile culinary adventure across China – not only to reveal its food, but its people, history, culture and soul. BBC Books acquired and published the title to accompany the BBC Two series of four hour-long episodes.

External links

BBC television documentaries
2010s British documentary television series
2010s British travel television series
2010s British cooking television series
2012 British television series debuts
2012 British television series endings
British cooking television shows
Food reality television series
English-language television shows
Chinese cookbooks